The 2019 FC Ordabasy season was the 17th successive season that the club played in the Kazakhstan Premier League, the highest tier of association football in Kazakhstan. Ordabasy finished the season in 3rd place, reached the Semifinal of the Kazakhstan Cup and were knocked out of the Europa League at the Second qualifying round stage by Mladá Boleslav.

Season Events

New Contracts
On 13 January, Timur Dosmagambetov signed a new contract with Ordabasy.

Squad

Transfers

In

Loans in

Released

Friendlies

Competitions

Premier League

Results summary

Results by round

Results

League table

Kazakhstan Cup

UEFA Europa League

Qualifying rounds

Squad statistics

Appearances and goals

|-
|colspan="14"|Players away from Ordabasy on loan:
|-
|colspan="14"|Players who left Ordabasy during the season:
|}

Goal scorers

Disciplinary record

References

External links
Official Website

FC Ordabasy seasons
Ordabasy